The Class G is an electric multiple unit train type used on the Berlin U-Bahn.

Specifications

Formation
Each set consists of two cars, only one of which has a driving cab. Thus, the smallest operable formation is a four-car train. Up to four two-car sets can be operated together.

Electric systems
The trains are powered by one self-ventilated motor per bogie. Both axles are powered through two hollow-shaft gears.

Interior
The interior features longitudinal seats.

History
Twelve sets were lent to the Athens Metro between 1983 and 1985. Class GI trains replaced all Class A1 and A2 trains by 5 November 1989. In 1997, 60 sets were sold to North Korea.The train received new features over the years. The automatic next station announcements that where first on the BVG Class H trains were added to the BVG Class G trains in the early 2000s. A twin lcd advisement displays where also added and since 2010s, the left screen shows next station information. The GI/1 trains were refurbished into GI/1E trains between 2005 and 2007 giving the outside unibody a full paint livery of yellow. The refurbished interior received yellow polls, new seats and the door handles to open the doors were removed and replaced with a button. The interior of the doors were also repainted gray replaced the oak brown color.

Korean State Railway 500 series

After the GI class were withdrawn from use on the Pyongyang Metro, they were converted by the Kim Chong-t'ae Electric Locomotive Works to operate as EMUs on the national railway lines of the Korean State Railway, which numbered them in the 500 series. They are frequently seen in the northern part of North Korea, running along the Hambuk Line, the Pukpu Line and the Manpo Line; they are occasionally seen running as mixed trains pulling regular railway freight cars.

References

External links

Berlin U-Bahn
Train-related introductions in 1975
Electric multiple units of Germany
Locomotives of North Korea
750 V DC multiple units